Mutant Funk is the fifth studio album by Praga Khan. It was released in 2000.

Track listing
 "The Power of the Flower" – 6:00	
 "Love" – 4:29	
 "Meditation" – 5:18	
 "Keep the Dream Alive" – 5:28	
 "Pittsburgh Angel" – 4:52	
 "Sayonara Greetings" – 3:55	
 "Dreamcatcher" – 4:55	
 "Turn Me On" – 3:13	
 "Northern Lights" – 6:02	
 "The Moon" – 5:30	
 "Immortal Sin" – 3:45	
 "Eyeless in El Paso" – 4:10

Certifications

Notes

2000 albums
Praga Khan albums